This is a list of regions of the Kyrgyz Republic (Kyrgyzstan) by Human Development Index as of 2023 with data for the year 2021.

See also 
 List of countries by Human Development Index

References 

Kyrgyzstan
Kyrgyzstan
Human Development Index
Regions By Human Development Index